"She's Mad" is a single by David Byrne. It was released in 1992 in support of Byrne's solo album Uh-Oh.

The song reached No. 3 on the U.S. Modern Rock Tracks chart.

Music video
A music video was released for the song, featuring Byrne being distorted by special effects while singing. The video was directed by Byrne and the special effects were done by Carlos Arguello and Michele Ferrone. In addition to that, it was nominated for Breakthrough Video and Best Special Effects for the 1992 MTV Video Music Awards.

Track listing 
All tracks written by David Byrne unless noted.

12" release

 She's Mad (album version) - 5:21
 Buck Naked (live) - 3:36
 Greenback Dollar (live) - 1:52 (Hoyt Axton, Kennard Ramsey)

7" release

 She's Mad (single edit) - 3:58
 Somebody - 4:59

References 

1992 songs
David Byrne songs